Zahreh (also Romanized as Zohreh) is a city and capital of Cham Khalaf-e Isa District, in Hendijan County, Khuzestan Province, Iran.  At the 2006 census, its population was 1,282, in 267 families.

References

Populated places in Hendijan County

Cities in Khuzestan Province